William Bartholomew may refer to:

 William Bartholomew (British Army officer) (1877–1962), British general
 William Bartholomew (cricketer) (fl. 1773–89), English cricketer
 William Bartholomew (writer) (1793–1867), English librettist, composer, and writer
 William Hamond Bartholomew (1831–1919), English engineer